K-58 is a  east–west state highway in the U.S. state of Kansas. K-58's western terminus is at K-99 west of Madison. It runs east through Lamont and Gridley and after a short concurrency with US-75, it goes through LeRoy before ending at the eastern terminus at U.S. Route 169 (US-169) near Colony. It is one of the newer state highways in Kansas formed on September 20, 2004, when K-57 was truncated at K-4 in Dwight. The route changes were made because of K-57's long concurrencies with K-4, K-177, US-50 and K-99.

Route description
K-58 begins at K-99 west of Madison, begins travelling east, and then enters Madison as West Madison Street. It continues through Madison, then turns south and follows 4th Street to the northern terminus of K-249. Here the highway turns eastward to follow Lincoln Street out of the city. The highway then crosses Halderman Creek, as it turns southeastward. It soon curves back east and after , passes through Lamont. Just past Lamont, K-58 crosses Long Creek, then crosses into Coffey County  later. It continues east  as it enters Gridley. It continues through the city for  then exits the city. As it exits Gridley, it crosses Varvel Creek, as it continues east. The two routes cross South Big Creek, then K-58 leaves the overlap and heads east. Within Le Roy, K-58 crosses the BNSF Railway, and then exits the city. About  past Le Roy, the highway enters into Anderson County. About  into the county it crosses Little Indian Creek then Indian Creek,  later.

The Kansas Department of Transportation (KDOT) tracks the traffic levels on its highways, and in 2018, they determined that on average the traffic varied from 325 vehicles just east of Lamont to 2410 vehicles on the overlap with US-75. The only section of K-58 included in the National Highway System is its overlap with US-75. The National Highway System is a system of highways important to the nation's defense, economy, and mobility. K-58 also connects to the National Highway System at its junction with US-169.

History

Former designation
The first K-58 was formed in 1927, with its western terminus at US-50 northeast of Lenexa, and its eastern terminus at US-73E, or Metcalf Avenue.

By 1936, US-73E was renumbered as US-69, and K-58 was realigned. It began at US-50 near Lenexa, Kansas, and followed Metcalf Avenue/US-69 north to Southwest Boulevard (now Merriam Drive). It turned east to Antone Road (now 34th Street) near the Argentine neighborhood of Kansas City, Kansas, where it headed north to Strong Avenue. It turned east on Strong, and headed north on (what is today) the Goddard Viaduct. It then headed east on Argentine Boulevard, crossed the Kansas River on the Argentine Bridge, and headed north on 18th Street to K-5, the Quindaro Boulevard, where it ended.

In 1956, the 18th Street Expressway was completed, allowing a rerouting of US-69 off of then Southwest Boulevard. A new toll bridge over the Kansas River was built for the expressway, and the Argentine Bridge was demolished.

Due to the rerouting of US-50 out of downtown Mission, Kansas, K-158 was created. It ran on Johnson Drive from 18th Street Expressway to Metcalf.

In 1979, K-58 and K-158 were given to the cities of Roeland Park, Overland Park, and Mission, Kansas. K-58 became the first of several highways to be turned back, shortened, or realigned in Kansas City, as the Interstate highways were being completed.

In 1996, extensive reconstruction was completed in Roeland Park, Kansas, where K-58 formerly traveled. As a result, the former Skyline Drive interchange was transformed into an at-grade intersection, also eliminating the Skyline tunnel underneath the expressway. When this was completed, Johnson County, Kansas renamed the segment from Shawnee Mission Parkway to I-35 as "Roe Boulevard", a continuation of "Roe Avenue" from Fairway, Kansas to I-35.

New designation
The current K-58 was designated in a September 20, 2004 resolution. It replaced a former alignment of K-57, which was truncated to Dwight at this time.

Major intersections

References

External links

Kansas Department of Transportation State Map
KDOT: Historic State Maps

058
Transportation in Greenwood County, Kansas
Transportation in Coffey County, Kansas
Transportation in Anderson County, Texas